Olaf Mayer (born 18 February 1961) is an Austrian boxer. He competed in the men's super heavyweight event at the 1984 Summer Olympics.

References

1961 births
Living people
Super-heavyweight boxers
Austrian male boxers
Olympic boxers of Austria
Boxers at the 1984 Summer Olympics
Place of birth missing (living people)
20th-century Austrian people